Soyuz TMA-9 was a Soyuz mission to the International Space Station (ISS) launched by a Soyuz FG launch vehicle. It was a human spaceflight mission transporting personnel to and from the ISS. It launched from the Baikonur Cosmodrome on 18 September 2006 at 08:09 MSD (04:09 UTC), docked with the ISS at 09:21 MSD (05:21 UTC) on 20 September, and returned to Earth on 21 April 2007. Soyuz TMA-9 transported two-thirds of ISS Expedition 14 to the space station along with one "spaceflight participant" who performed several experiments on behalf of the European Space Agency.

Crew

Crew notes

Daisuke Enomoto was originally scheduled to be the spaceflight participant, but on 21 August 2006, he was determined to be unfit for the flight due to medical reasons, and replaced by Anousheh Ansari, his back-up crew member.

Docking with ISS

Docked to ISS: 20 September 2006, 05:21 UTC (to aft port of Zvezda)
Undocking from ISS: 10 October 2006 19:14 UTC (from aft port of Zvezda)
Docking to ISS: 10 October 2006 19:34 UTC (to nadir port of Zarya)
Undocking from ISS: 29 March 2007 23:30 UTC (from nadir port of Zarya)
Docking to ISS: 29 March 2007 23:54 UTC (to aft port of Zvezda)
Undocking from ISS: 21 April 2007 09:11 UTC (from aft port of Zvezda)

Mission highlights
Soyuz TMA-9, known within the International Space Station program as ISS Soyuz 13, was the 32nd crewed flight to the ISS. It is of note because for three days, from 18–21 September 2006, it marked the first time since before the Columbia accident that twelve humans have been in space simultaneously; three aboard the International Space Station (Expedition 13), three aboard Soyuz TMA-9, and six aboard Space Shuttle Atlantis, flying mission STS-115.

The capsule successfully launched from Baikonur Cosmodrome in Kazakhstan on a Soyuz-FG rocket at 09:08 MDS (04:08 UTC) on Monday 18 September 2006. It successfully docked with the ISS on Wednesday 20 September to begin a six-month stay on the orbiting laboratory.

Anousheh Ansari, the Spaceflight Participant launched by TMA-9, has returned to Earth safely alongside Commander Pavel Vinogradov and Flight Engineer Jeffrey Williams of the Expedition 13 crew aboard Soyuz TMA-8 on 29 September 2006 at 01:13 UTC. Undocking from the ISS took place at 21:53 UTC on 28 September. López-Alegría and Tyurin undocked from ISS on 21 April 2007, 09:11 UTC, and landed at 12:31:30 UTC, after a seven-month stay on the station.

References

External links

Soyuz TMA-9
Soyuz TMA-9 Relocation On ISS YouTube video

Crewed Soyuz missions
Spacecraft launched in 2006
Orbital space tourism missions
Spacecraft which reentered in 2007
Spacecraft launched by Soyuz-FG rockets